Tram İzmir, alternatively known as İzmir Tram, is a tram network in İzmir, Turkey. Owned by the İzmir Metropolitan Municipality and operated by İzmir Metro A.Ş., the system consists of two separate, unconnected lines: one in Karşıyaka, which opened on 11 April 2017, and the other in Konak, which opened on 24 March 2018.

The total cost of these two lines is about ₺450 million (approx. US$120 million).

History

The first tram line in İzmir opened in 1890, between Alsancak Terminal and Pasaport pier. The Alsancak-Pasaport portion was abandoned in 1956 and the last remaining line in İzmir (Konak-Pasaport) was taken up in the early 1960s. Automobile traffic rose greatly in the decades that followed and in the early 2000s, the city was plagued with congestion in central areas.

In 2009, the Metropolitan Municipality released an overall transportation plan for the city. The plan included the construction of three new tram lines: one in Konak, Karşıyaka and in Buca respectively. These three lines were to be integrated with the city's metro line as well as the two commuter rail lines. Construction was originally expected to start by the end of 2011; however, due to the delayed Environmental Impact Report, this date was pushed back to 2015. In 2013, the Municipality secured necessary funding from the Ministry of Development and finalized system plans in 2014. In the finalized plan, the Buca Tram line was removed due to pressure from the Ministry of Transport. Construction began in April 2015 on the Karşıyaka Tram, and in November 2015 on the Konak Tram.

The first tram vehicles were delivered in 2016 and showcased at the İzmir International Fair in August of the same year. The rest of the vehicles were delivered in February 2017.

The general name of the system was branded Tram İzmir by the Metropolitan Municipality.

Karşıyaka Tram Line 
It has 14 stations and began operation in April 2017. The tram line begins at Alaybey as a single track line with passing loops. After Karşıyaka station, the line proceeds with two tracks on the Alaybey bound side of Cemal Gürsel Avenue. Between Yunuslar and Bostanlı the Ataşehir bound track crosses Cemal Gürsel Avenue and the line proceeds on both sides of the road. After crossing Bostanlı Creek, the line runs through Cengiz Topel Street. The tramline the continues through the median of Dudayev Blvd. The depot is located next to Çevre Yolu station.

Konak Tram Line 

The line serves 19 stations and began operating on 24 April 2018. The entire line is double track. The Halkapinar and Fahrettin Altay bound tracks run on opposite sides of the Mustafa Kemal Sahil Boulevard from Fahrettin Altay station to Sadık Bey Station. Then after Sadık Bey, the two lines run parallel to each other, between the seaside and the west-bound Mustafa Kemal Sahil Boulevard. The Tramline turns inland at Gazi Boulevard and the track runs through the median. The line then turns onto Şair Eşref Boulevard, where the tracks are laid on the left most lane of each direction. The lines split past the Alsancak Train Station with the Halkapınar bound line taking Şehitler Street and the Fahrettin Altay bound track following Liman Street. The lines meet up again along Şehitler Street just before arriving at Halkapınar.

Çiğli Tram
The line will be one track except Ataşehir Pazaryeri, Ataşehir, Çevreyolu, and Katip Çelebi Üniversitesi stations.

Service

The system operates 24/7 with a varying headway. On the Karşıyaka line, there is a ten-minute headway. On the Konak line, during Monday through Saturday, there is a six/seven and a half-minute headway and during Sunday, there is a seven and a half/ten-minute headway. In 2018, İzmir Tram transported 110,000 passengers per day.

Infrastructure

The system operates on its own right of way as well as automobile lanes, despite the latter utilized less so, and is electrified with 750 V DC overhead wire and consists of Communications-based train control (CBTC) signalling. Most of the network is double-tracked, except for a short portion between Karşıyaka pier and Alaybey. The tracks are standard track gauge at 1,435 mm (4 ft 8 1⁄2 in).Both lines will have their own storage and maintenance depots, in Mavişehir and Halkapınar respectively. The tramcars are produced by Hyundai Rotem plant in Adapazarı. The double-ended 32 m (105 ft)-long five-module tramcars are each 43.1 t heavy. They have 48 seating capacity, and can carry up to 285 passengers each. Service speed is 24 km/h (15 mph), and top speed is 70 km/h (43 mph). 

Each station is wheelchair-accessible and consists of its own platform, segregated from any sidewalk or street. Information panels showing the real-time status of the next tram are installed in all operating stations.

See also 
 Transport in Izmir
 Rail Transport in Izmir
 Izmir Metro
 Trams in Izmir

References

Tram transport in İzmir
Railway lines opened in 2017
Railway lines opened in 2018
2017 establishments in Turkey
2018 establishments in Turkey
Karşıyaka District
Konak District